The Northern Tasmanian Football Association may refer to one of two leagues:

Northern Tasmanian Football Association (1886–1986), the original NTFA
Northern Tasmanian Football Association (formed 1996), current version of the NTFA